The Chartered Institution of Water and Environmental Management (CIWEM) is an independent professional body and a registered charity in the United Kingdom that works internationally to advance the science and practice of water resource management and environmental resource management for sustainability. It is licensed by the Science Council to award Chartered Scientist and Chartered Environmentalist status to qualifying members. It is a member of the Society for the Environment.

The organisation was formed in 1987 when the Institution of Public Health Engineers, the Institution of Water Engineers and Scientists, and the Institute of Water Pollution Control merged. It was granted a Royal Charter in 1995.

CIWEM Awards

CIWEM presents a number of yearly awards. Since 2007 the organisation has run the CIWEM Environmental Photographer of the Year (EPOY) competition for photographers and filmmakers, with the aim of raising international awareness of environmental and social issues such as climate change and social inequality. Winning and shortlisted photographs and films are featured in an exhibition at the Royal Geographical Society in London before touring the UK.

Other awards presented by CIWEM have included Sustainable Wetland of the Year, Tomorrow's Water, and the Environmental Parliamentarian of the Year Award.  they run the Environmental Photographer of the Year, Young Environmentalist of the Year (YETOY), UK Junior Water Prize in association with the Stockholm International Water Institute, and the Nick Reeves Award for Arts and the Environment.

See also

 Chartered Institution of Wastes Management
 List of organisations in the United Kingdom with a royal charter
 List of professional associations in the United Kingdom

References

External links
 CIWEM website
 CIWEM Competitions and Awards

ECUK Licensed Members
Environmental management-related professional associations
International professional associations
Organisations based in the London Borough of Camden
Water and Environmental Management
1987 establishments in the United Kingdom